McKail is a north-western suburb of Albany in southern Western Australia. Its local government area is the City of Albany.  The suburb has a median age of 33.  McKail was named after John MacKail who in 1835 wrongly killed Whadjuk Noongar Goggalee and was forced to leave the Swan River settlement.

References

Suburbs of Albany, Western Australia